Hans Ehrenbaum-Degele (24 July 1889 – 28 July 1915) was a German writer.

He was born in Berlin, Germany, as a son of a wealthy Jewish banker. He was the partner of Friedrich Wilhelm Murnau and was a musician and wrote over 100 various pieces. He fought on the Russian front during the First World War, and was killed in action at Narev, Russian Empire, in 1915.

External links 
 F. W. Murnau - 1888-1919 at www.filmmuseum-berlin.de
 a
 Hans Ehrenbaum-Degele (1889 – 1915) – German poet, writer and editor at forgottenpoetsofww1.blogspot.com/
 

19th-century German writers
20th-century German writers
German military personnel killed in World War I
Jewish German writers
Writers from Berlin
1889 births
1915 deaths
19th-century German male writers
20th-century German male writers
German gay writers